is a Japanese Shibuya-kei musician. As of 2015, she has released 10 studio albums, 3 extended plays and several singles. Her music has been featured in multiple movies and television commercials.

Life and career
Mayumi Kojima was born in Tokyo. When she was in high school, she heard some music by Rosemary Clooney and suddenly became captivated by American 50s music. But English lyrics were troublesome, so she decided to make her own music. In childhood, influenced by her brother, she enjoyed listening to classical music, but with the new influence of 50s and 60s pop, she wanted to cross jazzy rhythms with different musical genres like the old pop artists did. At the age of 18, she wrote her first song, and the demo tape was noticed by a record company. From then on, her life as a musician started. She made her debut release on July 21, 1995, with the single , and in 1998, having released 3 albums and 6 singles since her debut, she went on her first national tour.

Kojima's music was licensed by companies for use in commercials, the first of which were Calbee. This was followed by other commercials and use in other television media. In 1999, Kojima provided the song  for the NHK TV program Minna no Uta. In addition, she was also in charge of animation for the song using her characteristic illustration style often seen on her album covers. In 2001, Nintendo aired a commercial in Japan for the Game Boy Advance which was later edited as a commercial for the video game Super Mario Advance 4 in the United States, in which Kojima's song, was featured. The original commercial was on air from 2001 to 2002 with the Super Mario Advance 4 variant being one of the first times non-Japanese people were exposed to her music. In 2005, Kojima's song  was used as the opening theme song of Production I.G.'s 20th anniversary project, the anime Ghost Hound.

In 2015, as part of the celebration of the 20th anniversary of her debut, she collaborated with Israeli surf rock band Boom Pam to create the album With Boom Pam, which consists of new interpretations of some of her earlier songs in a new style influenced by Mediterranean surf rock. The album was released on July 22, 2015.
On the same day, the limited edition commemorative album compilation  was also released. It includes her three first albums, also called the Cécile trilogy, in new remastered UHQCD format with previously unreleased demos, instrumentals and alternate takes/mixes. Furthermore, the unfinished album  is included.

Discography

Albums

Extended plays

Singles

Live albums

Compilations

DVDs

References

External links

Mayumi Kojima at Space Shower Music
Mayumi Kojima Discography
Mayumi Kojima Discography at Pony Canyon

1972 births
Living people
Singers from Tokyo
Shibuya-kei musicians
21st-century Japanese singers
21st-century Japanese women singers